Zasele is a village in Svoge Municipality, Sofia Province, western Bulgaria.

Zasele Peak in Antarctica is named after the village.

References

Villages in Sofia Province